The Moldy Peaches is the debut album by American indie rock band The Moldy Peaches. It was primarily recorded in a basement in Port Townsend, Washington and was released in 2001. The album has the dubious distinction of being released in the U.S. on September 11, 2001, the date of the attacks on the World Trade Center, while coincidentally featuring a song called "NYC's Like a Graveyard".

The song "Anyone Else but You" was used in the Academy Award-winning 2007 film Juno. The film and soundtrack also contain a version of the song performed by the two lead actors in the film, Elliot Page and Michael Cera.

Critical reception 

In a positive review for NME magazine, music critic Kitty Empire called The Moldy Peaches "extremely amusing and often brilliant" because of its endearing songs and absurdist lyrics, which she felt distinguishes the band from other indie acts. Robert Christgau of The Village Voice found Dawson's songwriting more endearing and vulnerable than the "ambitious" Green, but said that they are both "cute folkies who break without warning into punk noise and sing a deeply catchy song called 'Who's Got the Crack,' cute floozies who'll fuck anybody with anything when that's their mood or stage of life".

In a less enthusiastic review for Rolling Stone, Jenny Eliscu wrote that the "joyously messy" album is made up mostly of "low-fi, potty-mouthed indie rock" and raunchy humor, which listeners will either find "hilarious or stupid". AllMusic's Daniel Greenwald was more critical and said the Moldy Peaches tried to be funny with their use of provocative language, but sounded like a witless, untalented version of the indie band Beat Happening.

The Moldy Peaches finished 31st in the voting for the Pazz & Jop, an annual critics poll run by The Village Voice. Christgau, the poll's creator, placed it second on his own year-end list. Mojo magazine ranked it 29th on its list of 2001's best records. In a retrospective review for The Rolling Stone Album Guide (2004), editor Christian Hoard wrote that the album showcased a songwriting duo who could successfully combine "oddball juvenalia and superb melodies". In his ballot for Rolling Stones decade-end poll, Christgau later named The Moldy Peaches the 11th best album of the 2000s.

Track listing
 "Lucky Number Nine" – 2:08
 "Jorge Regula" – 3:06
 "What Went Wrong" – 1:36
 "Nothing Came Out" – 5:04
 "Downloading Porn with Davo" – 2:24
 "These Burgers" – 2:01
 "Steak for Chicken" – 2:43
 "On Top" – 2:03
 "Greyhound Bus" – 1:15
 "Anyone Else but You" – 2:59
 "Little Bunny Foo Foo" – 1:19
 "The Ballad of Helen Keller & Rip Van Winkle" – 2:08
 "Who's Got the Crack" – 3:25
 "Lucky Charms" – 3:08
 "D.2. Boyfriend" – 1:39
 "I Forgot" – 2:09
 "Lazy Confessions" – 1:48
 "NYC's Like a Graveyard" – 3:15
 "Goodbye Song" – 2:13

Personnel 
Credits are adapted from original CD track credits

 The Moldy Peaches

 Adam Green
 Kimya Dawson

Guest Musicians 

 Brian Piltin – bass on "Nothing Came Out", "Steak For Chicken" and "Who's Got The Crack?"; vocals on "Who's Got The Crack?"
 Jack Dishel – drums on "Nothing Came Out", "Steak For Chicken" and "Who's Got The Crack?"; vocals on "Nothing Came Out" and "Who's Got The Crack?"
 Chris Barron – guitar on "Anyone Else But You"; vocals on "Lucky Charms"
 Steve Espinola – piano on "Jorge Regula"
 Drew Blood – vocals and piano on "Downloading Porn With Davo"
 Denise Koleda – bass on "Little Bunny Foo Foo"
 Kurt Feldman – drums on "Little Bunny Foo Foo"
 Adam Goldstein – vocals on "Who's Got The Crack?"
 Hollis Smith – vocals on "Lucky Charms"

References

Further reading

External links 
 

2001 debut albums
The Moldy Peaches albums
Sanctuary Records albums